Walkden is a town in the City of Salford in Greater Manchester, England,  northwest of Salford, and  of Manchester.

Historically in the township of Worsley in Lancashire, Walkden was a centre for coal mining and textile manufacture.

In 2014, the electoral wards of Walkden North, Walkden South and Little Hulton had a combined population of 35,616.

History 
The name Walkden or Walkeden derives from the Old English denu, a valley, belonging to a man possibly called Wealca (fuller), an Old English personal name. It has been in existence since at least the 13th century. The name was recorded in documents dating to 1246.
In the local dialect and accent, it is pronounced Wogden.

A Roman road crossed the area roughly on the line of the present A6 road through Walkden and Little Hulton. In 1313, in a dispute involving land, a jury decided that Walkden was too small to be considered a hamlet or a town but was "only a place in Farnworth". In the 15th century Walkden appears to have covered a wider area than at present, spreading into Farnworth and Little Hulton. In 1765 "Walkden Moor" was the subject of a parliamentary Enclosure Act. The Duke of Bridgewater was the biggest landowner in 1786, owning over half the land. At one time Walkden was dominated by coal mines and textile manufacturing.

Industry
Walkden's industrial history links are mainly to coal mining, but also to cotton mills. There were many shafts for small collieries sunk to the shallow coal seams of the Worsley Four Foot mine on land owned by the Egertons, the Lords of the Manor of Worsley which included Walkden. Named shafts were, Speakman's, Edge Fold, Lloyd's and Hey's Field before 1770, Turnpike Lime, Barlow Fold, Scowcroft's, and Crippin's Croft before 1780, Pin Fold, Parr Fold and Tub Engine before 1790 and Grundy's Field, Stone, Windmill, Charlton's, and the Inclined Plane Pit all before 1800. The Worsley Navigable Levels linked many of the mines to the Bridgewater Canal at Worsley. The levels were used to transport coal from the mines of the Bridgewater Collieries in Walkden until railways were used as an improved form of transportation. After 1800 Urmston's Meadow, Moss Hill Top, Parkinson's and Sawney, Atkin's Croft, Barrack's, Magnall's, Ashton's Field and the Ellesmere were sunk but were independent of the levels. Walkden Yard or NCB Central Workshops was situated south of High Street, close to Ellesmere Colliery was partly in Little Hulton. It was built 1878 by the Bridgewater Trustees as a central works depot providing engineering services for their collieries and colliery railways. On the site there was a Drafting Office, Machine and Fitting workshop, Pump Shop, Joiners Shop, Electricians shop, Paint Shop, Blacksmith and Tinsmith Shop, Welders Shop, Locomotive Overhaul and Repair Shop, Waggon sheds and Waggon machine shop and a Conveyor Belt Repair Shop. The yard closed as a British Coal workshop in 1986 and is now a housing estate.

Governance 
Until 1894, Walkden lay within the township of Worsley in the ancient ecclesiastical parish of Eccles, within the Hundred of Salford in the historic county of Lancashire, although some parts including Linnyshaw and Toppings Bridge were within the parish of Deane. Worsley Urban District Council, which included Walkden, was formed in 1894. Walkden was amalgamated into the City of Salford metropolitan district of Greater Manchester in April 1974, as part of the provisions of the Local Government Act 1972, having previously formed part of the Worsley Urban District in the administrative county of Lancashire. Walkden is divided into three electoral wards; Little Hulton, Walkden North and Walkden South.

Walkden is part of the Worsley and Eccles South parliamentary constituency. Between 1983 and 2010 it was part of the Worsley parliamentary constituency. Between 1885 and 1983 Walkden lay in the now defunct Farnworth constituency and before that, from 1868 to 1885, within the South East Lancashire constituency.

Geography 

Walkden is situated at the junction of the A6 Manchester to Chorley road, the A575 Worsley to Moses Gate, Farnworth road and the B5232. The M61 motorway passes to the north of the town.

Culture and community 

Blackleach Country Park covers 50 hectares half-mile north of the town centre. The site is a designated local nature reserve. The reservoir was originally used by factories. The derelict and badly polluted site, next to a chemical waste tip, was crossed by a disused railway line. It was reclaimed and restored after a community campaign.

Landmarks 
The Ellesmere Centre had a clock-tower which is a replica of the Lady Bourke Clock which once stood by the NCB Offices in Bridgewater Road. It was taken down when the Tesco store was erected. The original clock was used to alert coal miners to the beginning or end of their shifts. The workers claimed that they could not hear the clock strike once at 1 o'clock to mark the end of dinnertime and the resumption of the working day, and it was altered to strike 13 times at 1.00pm, a tradition continued by the replica clock. The opening line of George Orwell's novel Nineteen Eighty-Four (1949), referring to the clocks striking thirteen, might have been inspired by his time in the area writing The Road to Wigan Pier (1937).

The Ellesmere Monument in St Paul's Churchyard was erected in 1868 to commemorate Harriet (d. 1866), wife of the 1st Earl of Ellesmere. It was designed by T. G. Jackson, and inspired by the medieval Eleanor crosses. It originally stood at the junction of the A6, A575 and B5232 roads but was moved into the churchyard in 1968 to reduce traffic congestion. Statues of four angels on the monument were stolen. A project to restore the monument was completed in 2006. It was later rebuilt.

Walkden Town Hall was demolished in 1999, to create extra car parking spaces for Walkden College.

Transport 
Walkden is at the junction of A6 and the Bolton to Worsley A575. The East Lancashire Road (A580) passes to the south and connects to the M60 ring-road and the motorway network. The M61 to the east of Walkden is in the Guinness Book of Records for being the widest section of motorway in Britain, (there are 17 lanes side by side at Linnyshaw Moss).

There are extensive and frequent bus services, mainly operated by Diamond Bus North West, linking the town with Manchester, Bolton and Leigh. Services include the 36 and 37 routes between Bolton and Manchester via Farnworth (37), Little Hulton (36) and Swinton.

Walkden once had two railway stations. In 1875, the London and North Western Railway opened a station on the Bolton-to-Eccles line known as Walkden Low Level. It was closed in 1954. The Lancashire and Yorkshire Railway provided a station on the Manchester-to-Wigan line in 1888. Walkden railway station, originally known as "Walkden High Level railway station", remains open. Both lines were built as a result of the coal mining in the area.

According to 2006 figures, Walkden station was used by over 150,000 passengers annually.; by 2012/2013 this had risen to 322,590. There are twice-hourly daytime services to both Manchester and Wigan, from where there are connecting services to Manchester Airport and the rest of the UK. This is reduced to an hourly service each way in the evenings. In 2009 the GMITA voted to approve funding for a one-year trial of hourly Sunday trains from Walkden, starting on 23 May 2010.

Education 

Walkden has several primary schools, two high schools and a sixth form college which include Co-op Academy Walkden and The Lowry Academy. Until 2014 Walkden had three high schools, before the closure of St. George's RC High School in July 2014.

Christ the King RC Primary School, James Brindley Primary School, Mesne Lea Primary School, North Walkden Primary School, St Mark's CE Primary School and St Paul's CE Primary School are primary schools in Walkden and serve students ages 3–11.

A number of the town's primary schools are church schools. They include: St Paul's, Crompton Street, and St Paul's, Heathside, which are both Church of England schools. Christ the King RC Primary School is the Roman Catholic primary school for Walkden, Worsley and Roe Green. In addition there are three county primary schools - they are North Walkden Primary School in the north of the town and Mesne Lea Primary School and James Brindley Primary School in south Walkden.

Salford City College, a post-16 vocational college, has a campus located in Walkden on Walkden Road, close to the railway station.

Religion 
St Paul's Church was founded in 1838 in the church school and was originally known as St George's Chapel. The foundation stone for St. Paul's at Walkden Moor was laid in 1847 by Lady Brackley, daughter of the Earl of Ellesmere. The church cost £4,500 and was dedicated in 1848 by the Bishop of Manchester. The church was extended in 1881 by the addition of the north aisle, built at a cost of £1,000 which was raised by the parishioners. The east windows date from 1884 and mosaic panels are from 1904.

St John's Church was founded in 1876 in Walkden although most of its parish is in Little Hulton, it is part of the Walkden & Little Hulton Team Ministry.

There are two Methodist churches, Walkden Methodist Church and Worsley Road North Methodist Church. Christ the King Roman Catholic Church serves the Roman Catholic communities of Walkden, Roe Green and Worsley. There is also a Congregational church.

Notable people 

Christopher Eccleston, actor
Sacha Parkinson, actress
Carol Klein, gardener and presenter of TV show Gardener's World
Jamie Moore, former British light-middleweight boxing champion
Alan Halsall, actor, Tyrone Dobbs in Coronation Street
Catherine Tyldesley, actress, Eva Price in Coronation Street
Sarah Whatmore, singer
Andrew Rushton, table tennis player
David Bamber, actor
Jason Done, actor
Adam Eckersley, footballer
Mark Barry, singer, BBMak
John Wilkinson, former chairman of Salford RLFC
John Hallows, footballer
Andrew Stevenson, DJ, skateboarder
Chris Irwin, rugby player

See also

 Listed buildings in Worsley

References 
Notes

Bibliography

External links 

Salford City Council's local information for Walkden

Towns in Greater Manchester
Geography of Salford